Gleanville Ervin Hepburn (November 4, 1938 – September 12, 1968) was an American football end and linebacker who played five seasons for the Omaha Mustangs in the Professional Football League of America and Continental Football League. He died on September 12, 1968, following head injuries received during a game against the Michigan Arrows.

Early life and education
Hepburn was born on November 4, 1938, though the year has been listed by some sources to be 1937 or 1936. He moved to Boys Town, Nebraska, following his graduation from Father Flanagan's Boys' Home. He attended high school at Boys Town, which led to him being offered a scholarship from Nebraska University. A school spokesman at Boys Town described him as, "was one of the finest boys ever to attend Boys’ Town. He's well remembered here and not just because he worked here. He was one of the first Negro boys to be elected mayor and maybe the best football player ever." He played one season for Nebraska's freshman football team, the Cornhuskers. An article by the Lincoln Journal Star called him an "outstanding freshman lineman at Nebraska U. in 1956". Shortly afterwards he transferred to Butler Community College in El Dorado, Kansas, where he attended until 1961. Afterwards he moved to Nebraska–Omaha. He was listed by The Benson Sun as a potential JV award candidate. He graduated following 1962; he was ruled ineligible to play for the season.

Professional career
Following college he had a brief stint with the Denver Broncos of the American Football League (AFL), but was released before the season start. Following the season he helped create the Omaha Mustangs professional football team. He played the 1964–1968 seasons with the Mustangs, as members of the Professional Football League of America (PFLA) and Continental Football League (CoFL). He was a two-way player, as an end on offense and linebacker of defense.

Injury and death
Hepburn was in serious condition following a 1968 week two game against the Michigan Arrows, when he was knocked unconscious in a pileup of players. He was rushed to the Martin Place East Hospital, where he fell into a coma that night. Doctors said he suffered a brief heart stoppage and ruptured brain vessel in the play. "His condition just got gradually worse," a doctor at the hospital said. He died from injuries sustained in the game on September 12, five days afterwards. He was buried in Miami, Florida, his hometown.

In 1969, the Continental Football League created the Glen Hepburn Memorial Award, given to those who help in community service. Nebraska–Omaha University also made an award to honor him, the Glen Hepburn Trophy, given to those who display defensive excellence.

References

1938 births
1968 deaths
People from Douglas County, Nebraska
Nebraska Cornhuskers football players
Butler Grizzlies football players
Butler Grizzlies men's basketball players
Nebraska–Omaha Mavericks football players
Denver Broncos players
Players of American football from Miami
Players of American football from Nebraska
Continental Football League players
Sports deaths in Michigan